Come Outside is a British educational children's television series that ran from 23 September 1993 to 18 March 1997, presented by and starring Lynda Baron as Auntie Mabel and her dog 'Pippin'. It remains one of the BBC's most successful and watched children's programmes of all time and due to its popularity, was repeated on CBeebies until late 2012.

Overview
The series aims to encourage young children to learn about the world around them. The starting point for each programme is something with which children may already be familiar, such as: wood, paper, boots, spiders, buses, soap and lampposts.

The two main characters are Auntie Mabel (played by Lynda Baron), and her dog Pippin, who was initially played by a female dog also called Pippin and later by the dog's grandson Mr Higgins. A feature of Come Outside is Auntie Mabel's unusual mode of transport: a small aeroplane (a Slingsby T67 Firefly) with multi-coloured polka dots.

Episodes

Transmissions

Characters
(Auntie) Mabel Featherstone – the main character of the show. She lives with her dog, Pippin. In some episodes a close up of Auntie Mabel's hand can be seen, revealing a wedding ring. Auntie Mabel never talks of her husband, but rather about her sister Edie. Played by Lynda Baron.
Pippin – Auntie Mabel's pet dog and the main animal character of the show. Pippin often has a comedy sub-plot during each episode, where she gets up to mischief without Mabel knowing. For example, in the episode "A Carton Drink", she eats the sausages from her lunchbox, in the episode "Soap", she hides the bar of soap to avoid having a bath, and the episode "A Woolly Jumper" ends with Pippin finding a jumper knitted by Auntie Mabel, and then pulling on it and causing it to unravel. Played by Pippin and Mr. Higgins.
Edie Featherstone – Auntie Mabel's sister, who is often referred to but never seen on screen. However, her voice was heard in the episode "A Woolly Jumper".
Jay –  Auntie Mabel's nephew, a young boy who only appeared in "A Rainy Day"
Great Aunt Edna – Auntie Mabel's great aunt, who is also never seen on screen, but is referred to by Mabel in the episode "Toothpaste".

Animals
Pippin was a mixed-breed dog, half Tibetan Terrier, half Bearded Collie, roughly third generation descended from the famous American acting dog Benji and was owned and trained by the award-winning animal trainer Ann Head. Pippin was quite old at the start of the first series in 1993 and so she performed the slower but more complex moves while her grandson, Mr. Higgins, performed any physically demanding actions.

Pippin retired at the end of Series 1 and Mr. Higgins took over the role of 'Pippin' entirely for Series 2 and 3. Mr. Higgins also starred as the Bakers dog for Bakers Complete pet food commercials and is still pictured on the products. He died in 2008 of old age while his grandmother, the original Pippin, died in the late 1990s.

Many other animals took part in Come Outside. Specially-shot footage included snails from London Zoo, frogs at Chester Zoo, geese at Folly Farm in Gloucestershire, rabbits at Tilgate Nature Centre in West Sussex, butterflies in the Butterfly Centre, Eastbourne, hedgehogs supplied by St. Tiggywinkles Animal Hospital and spiders from a private collection. In addition archive shots were provided by the BBC's Natural History Film Library in Bristol.

Production details
Elizabeth Bennett created the format and characters, wrote the scripts, directed many of the programmes and produced all three series.

Two different production companies were involved. Series 1 was made by Spelthorne Productions, which has since closed; Series 2 and 3 were made by Elizabeth Bennett's production company Tricorn Associates.

Aerial views of the various locations visited by Auntie Mabel were shot by Jeremy Braben.

Series 1 was set in a cottage on the corner of Denham Airfield in Buckinghamshire, and was used to provide the exterior shots of Auntie Mabel's house. She would come out of the house, walk through the back garden and on to the airfield to climb into her aeroplane (A 1989 Slingsby T67C Firefly registered G-RAFG). The interiors were shot at Capital Studios in Wandsworth, South West London. Chronologically, this series takes place after Series 2 & 3.

Series 2  was shot entirely on location, including the interiors of Auntie Mabel's house, with the exception of the bathroom in the Spiders episode which was shot in a studio. The cottage at Denham Airfield was occupied and so a new location had to be found. An empty cottage on some farmland in Harefield, Middlesex was rented. To allow for the change of location to be incorporated into the show's continuity, a programme about moving house was shot to link the two locations, which makes the first series the third chronologically. The plane (now a 1988 Slingsby T67C Firefly registered G-BOCM) was kept in a field nearby.

Series 3 was commissioned two years later and was also shot at the cottage in Harefield. A much older plane (A 1983 Slingsby T67M Firefly registered G-SFTZ) was used, now featuring a spiralled propeller

In every episode Mabel ventures outside and this involved shooting in many locations in the United Kingdom, such as a pencil factory in Keswick, the manufacture of Wellington boots in Dumfries, a pottery in Stoke, growing bulbs and attending the annual flower parade in Spalding, Lincolnshire and making brushes in Portsmouth.

Sometimes Auntie Mabel's adventures stayed closer to home. For example the episode "Buses", was filmed around the Ruislip area of North London. Scenes were also shot in Woodley, Berkshire, in the retail precinct and in the veterinary clinic.

In the episode "Marmalade" Auntie Mabel flies to Seville to visit an orange grove. Shooting was restricted to the one day on which the oranges were ready for harvesting. This was only known with very short notice and consequently arrangements to fly out were made at the last minute. It happened well outside the main production period by which time Lynda Baron was committed to other work and was not free to travel to Seville. To make it appear that Aunt Mabel had visited the orange grove, she was recorded in the studio against a Chroma key background while a body double was used for reverse angle shots of her in Spain.

Animation sequences for stories, songs and skits was done by Penny Holten, Touch Animation, Really Animated Pictures and Ealing Animation (occasionally).

Awards and honours 
The episode entitled Bricks won the Royal Television Society Educational Television Award 1997 in the Pre-school and Infants category.

Home video 
The BBC issued a collection on VHS tapes in the early 2000s, later released on DVD. The complete series is now available in a DVD box set.
The BBC also released a collection of DVDs with booklets and notes not intended for home use but instead for use in schools and other educational purposes.

Come Outside: A Windy Day – DVD 1
Come Outside: Plants and Other Living Things – DVD 2
Come Outside: Natural Materials – DVD 3
Come Outside: Keeping Safe, Keeping Well – DVD 4
Come Outside: Food – DVD 5
Come Outside: Around Our Homes – DVD 6
Come Outside: Animals – DVD 7

A selection of books were issued by the BBC in the mid 90s based on the episodes.

References

External links 

Come Outside pilot Alan Cassidy's website Broadcast for Schools

BBC children's television shows
Television shows about dogs
1990s British children's television series
British television shows for schools
1993 British television series debuts
1997 British television series endings
British children's education television series
Television shows set in England
English-language television shows
CBeebies
Television series by BBC Studios